Alexandr Viktorovich Korshunov (born 2 April 1968 in Bălți, Moldovan SSR, Soviet Union) is a Transnistrian politician. He has been Speaker of the Transnistrian Supreme Council since 2019.

References 

1968 births
Living people
People from Bălți
Members of the Supreme Council (Transnistria)
21st-century Moldovan politicians